Park Kyung-suk may refer to:
 Park Kyung-suk (handballer) (박경석)
 Park Kyung-suk (taekwondo) (박경숙)